The Proton Putra (Malay, "son" or "prince") is a coupé automobile produced by Malaysian automobile company Proton. Production of the Putra started in late 1996 and ended in 2001, but was briefly relaunched in limited numbers in 2004 for the domestic market. The reasoning for the relaunch is the clearing of the remaining stocks available at the factory.

Specifications

Engine

The Putra's power-plant is derived from a Mitsubishi 4G93P DOHC engine, with the P representing Proton.

Export market
In the United Kingdom and Australia, the Putra was sold as the Proton Coupé or Proton M21, but sales were not strong as it was considered very bland looking and being aesthetically similar to the older 1992-1995 Lancer series 5 or Mitsubishi Lancer CC as known to Australians. Additionally, it was considered dull to drive compared to more adventurous competitors like the Ford Puma and Vauxhall Tigra.

Design
Based on Mitsubishi's Fourth generation Mirage Asti Lancer, the Putra is a two-door coupé with front end styling similar to that of both the Proton Wira and the first generation Proton Satria. The rear, however, features a more original design with only the taillights bearing similarities to those of the first generation Satria and fourth generation Lancer.

The vehicle is almost an exact replica of the 1992-1995 4th-generation Lancer both aesthetically and mechanically. The vehicle has headlights and taillights that are interchangeable with those of the Lancer. The Putra, however, is equipped with a Mitsubishi DOHC 4G93 engine and comes with a slightly different front bumper and fenders that make the indicators less interchangeable with those on the Mitsubishi Lancer.

Interior
The Putra's standard equipment included Recaro N-Joy seats, a leather Momo Daytona 4 steering and leather Momo gear knob. However, during the relaunch units of the Putras in Malaysia, the interior Recaros, Momo steering and gear knob ware not included as standard. The car instead it was refitted with normal seats and steerings but was available with black interior.

References

External links 

Proton Holdings Berhad

Proton vehicles
Cars introduced in 1996
1990s cars
Front-wheel-drive sports cars
Sport compact cars